Scanning Flow Cell (SFC) is an electrochemical technique, based on the principle of channel electrode. The electrolyte is continuously flowing over a substrate that is introduced externally on translation stage. In contrast to the reference and counter electrode that are integrated in the main channel or placed in side compartments connected with a salt bridge. SFC utilizes V-formed geometry with a small opening on the bottom (in range of 0.2-1mm diameter) used to establish the contact with sample. The convective flow is sustained also in non-contact mode of operation that allows easy exchange of the working electrode.

Application 
The SFC is employed for combinatorial and high-throughput electrochemical studies. Due to its non-homogenous flow profile distribution, it is currently used for comparative kinetic studies. SFC is predominantly used for coupling of electrochemical measurements with post analytical techniques like UV-Vis, ICP-MS, ICP-OES etc. This makes possible a direct correlation of electrochemical and spectrometric signal. This methodology was successfully applied for corrosion studies.

References 

Laboratory equipment